Nowa Cerkiew  is a village in the administrative district of Gmina Morzeszczyn, within Tczew County, Pomeranian Voivodeship, in northern Poland. It is located within the ethnocultural region of Kociewie in the historic region of Pomerania.

The village has a population of 428.

Nowa Cerkiew was a private church village of the monastery in Pelplin, administratively located in the Tczew County in the Pomeranian Voivodeship of the Polish Crown.

Transport
The Polish A1 motorway runs nearby, west of the village.

References

Nowa Cerkiew